Bismuth chloride (or butter of bismuth) is an inorganic compound with the chemical formula BiCl3.  It is a covalent compound and is the common source of the Bi3+ ion.  In the gas phase and in the crystal, the species adopts a pyramidal structure, in accord with VSEPR theory.

Preparation
Bismuth chloride can be synthesized directly by passing chlorine over bismuth.

2 Bi + 3 Cl2 → 2 BiCl3
or by dissolving bismuth metal in aqua regia, evaporating the mixture to give BiCl3·2H2O, which can be distilled to form the anhydrous trichloride.

Alternatively, it may be prepared by adding hydrochloric acid to bismuth oxide and evaporating the solution.

Bi2O3 + 6 HCl → 2 BiCl3 + 3 H2O

Also, the compound can be prepared by dissolving bismuth in concentrated nitric acid and then adding solid sodium chloride into this solution.

Bi + 6 HNO3 → Bi(NO3)3 + 3 H2O  + 3 NO2
Bi(NO3)3 + 3 NaCl → BiCl3 + 3 NaNO3

Structure 
In the gas phase BiCl3 is pyramidal with a Cl–Bi–Cl angle of 97.5° and a bond length of 242 pm. In the solid state, each Bi atom has three near neighbors at 250 pm, two at 324 pm and three at a mean of 336 pm, the image above highlights the three closest neighbours. This structure is similar to that of AsCl3, AsBr3, SbCl3 and SbBr3.

Chemistry

Bismuth chloride is hydrolyzed readily to bismuth oxychloride, BiOCl:

(aq) + (aq) + (l) ⇌ BiOCl (s) + 2 (aq)

This reaction can be reversed by adding an acid, such as hydrochloric acid.

Reaction of solid BiCl3 with water vapour below 50 °C has been shown to produce the intermediate monohydrate, BiCl3·H2O.

Bismuth chloride is an oxidizing agent, being readily reduced to metallic bismuth by reducing agents.

Chloro complexes
In contrast to the usual expectation by consistency with periodic trends, BiCl3 is a Lewis acid, forming a variety of chloro complexes such as [BiCl6]3− that strongly violates the octet rule.  Furthermore, the octahedral structure of this coordination complex does not follow the predictions of VSEPR theory, since the lone pair on bismuth is unexpectedly stereochemically inactive.  The dianionic complex [BiCl5]2− does however adopt the expected square pyramidal structure.

Organic catalysis

Bismuth chloride is used as a catalyst in organic synthesis. In particular, it catalyzes the Michael reaction and the Mukaiyama aldol reaction. The addition of other metal iodides increases its catalytic activity.

References

Bismuth compounds
Chlorides
Metal halides